Allium farctum is an Asian species of onions found high in the mountains of Pakistan and Afghanistan. It is a bulb-forming perennial up to 70 cm tall, producing a bulb up to 25 mm across. Flowers are white, borne in a tightly packed hemispheric umbel.

References

farctum
Onions
Flora of Afghanistan
Flora of Pakistan
Plants described in 1967